Tom S. Englund (born 14 December 1973) is a Swedish musician best known for being the vocalist and guitarist of Evergrey, of which he is also a founding member, as well as the vocalist of Redemption.

Discography with Evergrey

 The Dark Discovery (1998)
 Solitude, Dominance, Tragedy (1999)
 In Search of Truth (2001)
 Recreation Day (2003)
 The Inner Circle (2004)
 A Night to Remember (Gothenburg Concert CD&DVD) (2005)
 Monday Morning Apocalypse (2006)
 Torn (2008)
 Glorious Collision (2011)
 Hymns For The Broken (2014)
 The Storm Within (2016)
 The Atlantic (2019)
 Escape Of The Phoenix (2021)
 A Heartless Portrait (The Orphean Testament) (2022)

Other projects
Contributed vocals on Nightrage's album Sweet Vengeance (2003)
Produced and contributed backing vocals and additional guitar leads on Dragonland's album Starfall (2004)
Contributed lead guitars for the song "Equilibrium" on Moonlight Agony's album "Echoes Of A Nightmare" (2004)
Produced the Shot Injection demo Fear Comes Full Circle and guested on their EP Eleven Triple Manifest
Produced Awake (UK)'s 2007 album Illumination
Has recorded vocal parts for the seventh Ayreon album, 01011001
Has recorded vocal parts for the latest Odin's Court album, Deathanity
Contributed vocals for the song "World Beyond These Walls" on Dreamtone & Iris Mavraki's Neverland's 2008 album Reversing Time
Contributed vocals for the song "Graveheart" on Mind Key's 2009 album Pulse for a Graveheart
Contributed vocals for the song "Dark Side Of The Sun" on Emergency Gate's album The Nemesis Construct (2010)
Contributed guitar solo on The Absence's "Maelstrom" on the album Enemy Unbound (2010)
Contributed vocals on the Sweden United single "Open Your Eyes" (2010)
Contributed vocals on Nightrage's Insidious (2011)
Contributed vocals for the song "Oversight" on Twintera's 2012 album Lines
Contributed vocals on the Epysode album Fantasmagoria (2013)
Contributed vocals to the song "Shards of You", on Belgian metal band Mental Circus's 2013 album Mental Circus
Contributed vocals for the song "Obscure Illusions" on Ethernity's 2015 debut album
Contributed vocals for the song "Ghosts of Insanity" on DGM's 2016 album "The Passage"
Lead singer of Redemption since 2017; appears on the albums Long Night's Journey into Day and Alive in Color
Contributed clean vocals for the song "Soul Cartography" on Spanish North of South's album "The Tides in Our Veins" (2021)
Contributed vocals to the song "Silence The World" on Demon Hunter's album "Exile" (2022)
Contributed vocals to the song "The Deep" on Stranger Vision's album "Wasteland" (2022)

Equipment
 Caparison Guitars (TAT Special)
 Bogner Überschall
 Peavey poweramp 50/50
 4 4×12 cabinets
 Shure Wireless Systems
 Korg Triton Syntheseizer
 Korg N364 Syntheseizer

References

External links

 Evergrey.net
 Nightrage.com

1973 births
Swedish heavy metal guitarists
Swedish heavy metal singers
Living people
21st-century Swedish singers
21st-century guitarists
21st-century Swedish male singers
Evergrey members
Redemption (band) members